Cultural Deportiva Guarnizo is a Spanish football team based in Guarnizo, El Astillero, in the autonomous community of Cantabria. Founded in 1922, it plays in Tercera División RFEF – Group 3, holding home games at Estadio El Pilar, which has a capacity of 2,700 spectators.

History
In the 2014–15 season, the club won regional category Preferente Cantabria. It helped to start the next season in Tercera División.

Season to season

31 seasons in Tercera División
1 season in Tercera División RFEF

References

External links
Futbolme team profile 
Official website 

Football clubs in Cantabria
Association football clubs established in 1922
1922 establishments in Spain